This is a list of sister cities in the United States state of North Carolina. Sister cities, known in Europe as twin towns, are cities which partner with each other to promote human contact and cultural links, although this partnering is not limited to cities and often includes counties, regions, states and other sub-national entities.

Many North Carolina jurisdictions work with foreign cities through Sister Cities International, an organization whose goal is to "promote peace through mutual respect, understanding, and cooperation."

A
Asheville

 Birnam, Scotland, United Kingdom
 Dunkeld, Scotland, United Kingdom
 Karpenisi, Greece
 Osogbo, Nigeria
 San Cristóbal de las Casas, Mexico

 Valladolid, Mexico
 Vladikavkaz, Russia

B
Beaufort
 Beaufort, Malaysia

Boone
 Collingwood, Canada

Brevard
 Pietroasa, Romania

Burlington

 Gwacheon, South Korea
 Soledad de Graciano Sánchez, Mexico

C
Cary

 Hsinchu, Taiwan
 Markham, Canada
 County Meath, Ireland
 Le Touquet-Paris-Plage, France

Chapel Hill
 Puerto Baquerizo Moreno, Ecuador

Charlotte

 Arequipa, Peru
 Baoding, China
 Krefeld, Germany
 Kumasi, Ghana
 Limoges, France
 Wrocław, Poland

Concord

 Freeport, Bahamas
 Killarney, Ireland
 Siena, Italy

D
Durham

 Arusha, Tanzania
 Celaya, Mexico
 Durham, England, United Kingdom
 Kavala, Greece
 Kostroma, Russia
 Sibiu, Romania
 Tilarán, Costa Rica
 Toyama, Japan
 Zhuzhou, China

F
Fayetteville
 Saint-Avold, France

G
Gastonia

 Gotha, Germany
 Santiago de Surco (Lima), Peru

Greensboro

 Buiucani (Chișinău), Moldova

 Yingkou, China

Greenville
 Yeonsu (Incheon), South Korea

H
Hendersonville

 Almuñécar, Spain
 Pallanza (Verbania), Italy

Hickory
 Altenburger Land (district), Germany

K
Kitty Hawk
 Coulaines, France

L
Laurinburg
 Oban, Scotland, United Kingdom

M
Manteo
 Bideford, England, United Kingdom

Matthews
 Sainte-Maxime, France

Mooresville
 Hockenheim, Germany

Mount Airy
 Samut Songkhram, Thailand

R
Raleigh

 Compiègne, France
 Gibraltar
 Kingston upon Hull, England, United Kingdom
 Nairobi, Kenya
 Rostock, Germany

S
Saluda
 Carunchio, Italy

Salisbury
 Salisbury, England, United Kingdom

Sanford

 Atizapán de Zaragoza, Mexico
 Yixing, China

Southern Pines
 Newry, Mourne and Down, Northern Ireland, United Kingdom

V
Valdese
 Torre Pellice, Italy

W
Wilmington

 Bridgetown, Barbados
 Dandong, China
 Doncaster, England, United Kingdom
 San Pedro, Belize

Winston-Salem

 Buchanan, Liberia
 Freeport, Bahamas
 Kumasi, Ghana
 Nassau, Bahamas
 Ungheni, Moldova
 Yangpu (Shanghai), China

References

North Carolina
North Carolina geography-related lists
Populated places in North Carolina
Cities in North Carolina